Christina Fusano and Raquel Kops-Jones were the defending champions, but decided not to compete together. Fusano partnered with Angela Haynes, but lost in the first round to Jill Craybas and Tamarine Tanasugarn. Kops-Jones partnered with Abigail Spears, but lost in the semifinals to Anna-Lena Grönefeld and Vania King.

Grönefeld and King went on to win the title, defeating Craybas and Tanasugarn 7–6(7–3), 6–4 in the final.

Seeds

Draw

References
Main Draw

Challenge Bell
Tournoi de Québec
Can